In fluid dynamics, the Küssner effect describes the unsteady aerodynamic forces on an airfoil or hydrofoil caused by encountering a transverse gust. This is directly related to the Küssner function, used in describing the effect. Both the effect and function are named after Hans Georg Küssner (1900–1984), a German aerodynamics engineer.

Küssner derived an approximate model for an airfoil encountering a sudden step-like change in the transverse gust velocity; or, equivalently, as seen from a frame of reference moving with the airfoil: a sudden change in the angle of attack. The airfoil is modelled as a flat plate in a potential flow, moving with constant horizontal velocity. For this case he derived the impulse response function (known as Küssner function) needed to compute the unsteady lift and moment exerted by the air on the airfoil.

Notes

References
 
 H.G. Küssner (1937), "Flügel- und Leitwerkflattern" (in German)
 H.G. Küssner (1940), "Der schwingende Flügel mit aerodynamisch ausgeglichenem Ruder" (in German)
 H.G. Küssner (1940), "Allgemeine Tragflächentheorie" (in German)
 
 
 
  Page 3

External links
  Page 13. 
 

Aerodynamics
Aerospace engineering
Aircraft wing design
Fluid dynamics